Ctenochromis is a genus of haplochromine cichlids endemic to the Lake Tanganyika and Congo River basins in Africa.

At present, 5 species are validly described in Ctenochromis:

 Ctenochromis horei (Günther, 1894) 
 Ctenochromis luluae (Fowler, 1930)
 Ctenochromis oligacanthus (Regan, 1922)
 Ctenochromis pectoralis Pfeffer, 1893 – Pangani Haplo (listed as extinct by the IUCN, but this appears to be incorrect).
 Ctenochromis polli (Thys van den Audenaerde, 1964)

An undescribed population that appears to be a distinct species is:
 Ctenochromis aff. pectoralis

Footnotes

References

  [2009]: Ctenochromis species. Retrieved 2009-OCT-03.

 
Cichlid fish of Africa
Cichlid genera
Haplochromini